Valentin Hadaró (born 8 June 1995) is a Hungarian football player who plays for Kecskemét.

Club career
In July 2021, Hadaró signed for Kecskemét.

Club statistics

Updated to games played as of 27 June 2020.

References

External links
Profile at MLSZ 

1995 births
People from Kaposvár
Sportspeople from Somogy County
21st-century Hungarian people
Living people
Hungarian footballers
Association football midfielders
Kaposvári Rákóczi FC players
Kisvárda FC players
Kecskeméti TE players
Pécsi MFC players
Nemzeti Bajnokság I players
Nemzeti Bajnokság II players